Hants was a provincial electoral district in Nova Scotia, Canada, that, at the time of its dissolution, elected one member to the Nova Scotia House of Assembly. It existed from 1867 until 1949, at which point the district was divided into the current electoral districts of Hants East and Hants West.

Members of the Legislative Assembly 
Hants elected the following members to the Nova Scotia House of Assembly: 

From 1933 to 1949, Hants elected one member to the Legislative Assembly. Prior to 1933, the district elected two members. 

†There were two by-elections held in 1874, shortly followed by a general election. The by-elections of March 10th, 1874 saw Allison and McDougall replaced by Smith and Yeomans. The general election held on December 17th, 1874 saw the re-election of Allison and the election of Alfred Putnam.

Election results

1867 general election

1871 general election

1874 general election

1878 general election

1882 general election

1886 general election

1890 general election

1894 general election

1897 general election

1901 general election

1906 general election

1911 general election

1916 general election

1920 general election

1925 general election

1928 general election

1933 general election

1937 general election

1941 general election

1945 general election

References

Former provincial electoral districts of Nova Scotia